Inspirisys Solutions Limited, is an Information technology services company based in Chennai, India.  It is a subsidiary company of CAC Holdings Corporation, based out of Tokyo, Japan. Its main business is providing services in the areas of Enterprise Security, Cloud, Internet of Things, Infrastructure, Product Engineering & Development and Warranty Management Services. It operates through an all-India network of more than 100 locations in India with 9 regional offices and overseas offices in United States, UK, Middle East, Japan and Singapore.

History
The Accel group commenced operations with Accel Limited, which was incorporated in 1991. Accel Limited became a public limited company and changed its name to Accel Automation Limited in July 1997. Accel Limited was involved in the business of third party maintenance services for IT products. In December 1993, Accel Limited acquired the PC manufacturing facilities of Kothari Information Systems Limited, Bangalore and shifted operations in 1996 to Pondicherry. Accel Limited acquired Atreya Technologies and Industrial Development Private Limited, Delhi and the services business of Network Limited, Delhi in June 1996 and April 1997, respectively, to benefit from their service networks in relation to telecom/IT equipment.

In 1996 Accel started software development services by setting up an application development center in Chennai. In 1999 acquired the systems and engineering services business for Fujitsu icim which resulted in a formation of Accel ICIM systems and services Ltd . In 2004, the company made a strategic alliance with Singapore-based Frontline Technologies Corporation Limited and made Accel ICIM a joint venture between Accel Ltd and FTC and changed the name to Accel Frontline Ltd.in 2008, FTC was acquired by BT group Plc there by Accel Frontline became a subsidiary of BT frontline Limited. In 2011 Accel ltd the main promoter bought out BT Frontline's stake and it became a subsidiary of Accel Limited. Having bought back BT's stake, the company amalgamated all the IT services portfolio into one company i.e. Accel Frontline Limited (AFL). AFL operate in the domains of IT Infrastructure Management, Software Services, Warranty management and IT infrastructure Solutions.

In 2012, the company launched its initiatives to reduce the dependence on India business and grow through its international operations focusing on Outsourced Product Development and Engineering Services.

In 2014, CAC Holdings Corporation of Japan has picked up 51% equity in Accel Frontline Limited. CAC is well established software company in Japan with turnover in excess of US$400 Million.

In October 2018, the company changed its name to Inspirisys Solutions. Inspirisys employs over 3000 employees and operate through offices located in California, Tokyo, London, Dubai, Singapore and India.

References

Companies based in Chennai
Software companies of India
Software companies established in 1991
Information technology companies of India
Indian companies established in 1991
1991 establishments in Tamil Nadu
Companies listed on the National Stock Exchange of India
Companies listed on the Bombay Stock Exchange